The Halo 2 Original Soundtrack is the soundtrack for Bungie's 2004 video game Halo 2. The soundtrack was released as two separate volumes, released almost two years apart. Volume 1, released at the same time as Halo 2 on November 9, 2004, contains arranged instrumental pieces written by Martin O'Donnell and his partner Michael Salvatori, as well as "inspired-by" tracks from bands  Incubus, Hoobastank and Breaking Benjamin. Volume 2 was released on April 25, 2006 and contains all the game music arranged in a suite form.

O'Donnell, who had previously composed the music for Bungie games such as Myth and Halo: Combat Evolved, sought to develop the "Halo sound" of the previous game as well as introduce new sounds and influences to the music. The music was based on what was happening in the game, rather than using leitmotifs or theme repetitively. The music was recorded in pieces with a fifty-piece orchestra at Studio X in Seattle, Washington. To mark its release both Microsoft and Sumthing Else Music Works planned an aggressive marketing campaign.

Upon release, the music of Halo 2 was praised. Critics were split on the merits of Volume 1, with some publications enjoying the bonus offerings while others felt the first volume lacked cohesion. Volume 2 was declared the "real" soundtrack to Halo 2. Upon release both soundtracks became commercial successes, with more than 100,000 copies sold. The soundtracks' success was pointed to as a sign of increasing legitimacy of video game music in the entertainment industry. Halos music has since been played in concert settings, including Play! A Video Game Symphony and Video Games Live.

Background
In the summer of 2004, Halo 2 composer Martin O'Donnell and album producer Nile Rodgers decided it would be a good idea to present Halo 2s music in two distinct volumes. The first volume would contain the game's themes that were finished and mixed as well as "inspired-by" offerings from other artists. The first volume was released alongside the video game as Volume 1 on November 9 of the same year. As the soundtrack was finished before all the in-game music was completed, none of the tracks written by O'Donnell appear in Halo 2 in the same arrangement. The bands featured in Volume 1, including Breaking Benjamin and Incubus, were enthusiastic about adding music to the soundtrack. Incubus was tapped to produce a suite of music which appears scattered throughout the soundtrack as four movements. Incubus guitarist Mike Einziger said that "Halo is the only video game that ever inspired us to write a whole suite [of music]."

The first pieces of music O'Donnell wrote for Halo 2 were promotional in nature; O'Donnell scored the cinematic announcement trailer for Halo 2 on August 2, 2002, and followed up with interactive music for the Electronic Entertainment Expo 2003 Halo 2 demo. O'Donnell confirmed that the chanting monks of Halo: Combat Evolveds choral theme, along with additional guitars by Steve Vai, would return in Halo 2. O'Donnell noted that the new setting of Africa prompted him to look at "Afro-Cuban" influences, but most of this type of music did not make it to the final product. Rather than write for locations or use leitmotifs for all the different characters in what O'Donnell called a "Peter and the Wolf approach to music", O'Donnell wrote "sad music for sad moments, scary music to score the scary bits and so forth." Recurring themes developed more by accident than planning. Recording of orchestrated music was completed over several sessions with the Northwest Sinfonia orchestra at Studio X in Seattle, Washington.

Nile Rodgers produced both volumes of the soundtrack, in addition to writing and performing the track "Never Surrender" in collaboration with songwriter/remixer Nataraj. Rodgers himself is a video game player, noting in an interview that "30% to 40% of the [recording] budget was spent in downtime playing video games. Since all that money was going to that part of the recording session, I decided to figure out what was so compelling about it, and I got hooked [by the game]."

Due to legal issues, the second Halo 2 soundtrack containing the entire finished score, Volume 2, was not released until more than a year after the soundtrack had been mixed and mastered. The volume's music is formatted in a 'suite' structure that corresponds with the chapters within the game, in order to create a "music representation" of the video game. O'Donnell stated that this presentation of the music as a concept album was natural because the overall story and atmosphere of Halo 2 directly influenced the sound to begin with.

Promotion
The first volume of the Halo 2 Original Soundtrack was specifically timed to coincide with the launch of the video game, to cash in on the "Halo effect"; players would go to buy the game and get the soundtrack and other merchandise by association. The first several million copies of the game sold all contained promotional inserts for the soundtrack. The soundtrack was seen as an integral part of the marketing and merchandise push Microsoft planned for Halo 2. The soundtrack's publisher, Sumthing Distribution, also planned and executed an aggressive marketing campaign, including special music listening stations and side-by-side soundtrack and game placement at participating retailers. The "Halo Theme MJOLNIR Mix", the first track on Volume 1,  was released on November 22, 2007 as a free track for Guitar Hero III: Legends of Rock on the Xbox 360.

Reception

Upon release, the reaction to Halo 2s score was generally positive. Reception for the two soundtrack releases, however, varied. Volume 1's inclusion of other artists in addition to original music received both praise and criticism. Mike Brennan Soundtrack.net's review claimed that the inclusion of Hoobastank and Breaking Benjamin as well as Incubus made the soundtrack "more harsh" sounding but overall lacked cohesion. On the other hand, G4 TV found the four-part Odyssey by Incubus comprised "a progressive rock/fusion jam the likes of which haven't been recorded since the 1970s."

Nuketown.com declared that Volume 2 was the soundtrack that fans had been waiting for; other publications agreed, saying that it "feels like the real soundtrack to Halo 2". IGN found the soundtrack ultimately enjoyable, but felt that the more traditional orchestration that appeared in Halo 2 clashed with the ambient and electronic sounds that had appeared before, making the album "divided".

Overall, the Halo 2 soundtracks sold well. Volume 1 sold more than 100,000 copies, and peaked at the number 162 position of the Billboard 200, the first video game soundtrack to ever enter the chart. This compares favorably to typical movie soundtracks, which generally sell no more than 10,000 copies. The Halo 2 Original Soundtracks success was pointed to as a sign of increasing legitimacy of video game music in the entertainment industry, which had graduated from "simple beeps" to complex melodies with big budgets.

Track listings

Volume 1

Volume 2

Personnel
All information is taken from the CD credits.
 Martin O'Donnell (ASCAP) – composer
 Michael Salvatori (ASCAP) – composer
 Simon James – concert master/contractor
 Christian Knapp – Northwest Sinfonia conductor
 Marcie O'Donnell – choir conductor
 Nile Rodgers – producer
 Nile Rodgers, Michael Ostin – music co-supervisors
 Lorraine McLees – album art director

References

2004 soundtrack albums
 2
Video game soundtracks
Albums produced by Nile Rodgers